On Length and Shortness of Life (or On Longevity and Shortness of Life; Greek: Περὶ μακροβιότητος καὶ βραχυβιότητος; Latin: De longitudine et brevitate vitae) is a text by the Ancient Greek philosopher Aristotle and one of the Parva Naturalia.

External links

On longevity and shortness of life, translated by G. R. T. Ross
 
Original Greek text:

Greco interattivo
Mikros Apoplous (with Modern Greek translation and notes)

Works by Aristotle